Abdul Karim Nizigiyimana Makenzi (born 21 June 1989 in Bujumbura), known as Karim Nizigiyimana, is a Burundian professional footballer who plays as a defender for Kenyan Premier League club Wazito FC and the Burundi national team. He played for Gor Mahia between 2015 and 2018.

References

External links
 
 
 Karim Nizigiyimana at Footballdatabase

1989 births
Living people
Sportspeople from Bujumbura
Burundian footballers
Burundian expatriate footballers
Association football defenders
Burundi international footballers
Vital'O F.C. players
APR F.C. players
S.C. Kiyovu Sports players
Rayon Sports F.C. players
AS Vita Club players
Gor Mahia F.C. players
Vipers SC players
Burundian expatriate sportspeople in Rwanda
Expatriate footballers in Rwanda
Burundian expatriate sportspeople in the Democratic Republic of the Congo
Expatriate footballers in the Democratic Republic of the Congo
Burundian expatriate sportspeople in Kenya
Expatriate footballers in Kenya
Burundian expatriate sportspeople in Uganda
Expatriate footballers in Uganda
2019 Africa Cup of Nations players
Prince Louis FC players